The 1982 Tennessee gubernatorial election was held on November 2, 1982. Incumbent Republican Lamar Alexander defeated Democratic nominee Randy Tyree with 59.6% of the vote.

Primary elections
Primary elections were held on August 5, 1982.

Democratic primary

Candidates
Randy Tyree, Mayor of Knoxville
Anna Belle Clement O'Brien, State Senator
Tom Henry
Tommy McKnight
John G. Love 	
Luther M. Kindall
James W. Thomas
Virginia Nyabongo
Boyce McCall

Results

General election

Candidates
Lamar Alexander, Republican 
Randy Tyree, Democratic

Results

References

1982
Tennessee
Gubernatorial